Elizabeth Jane Weston (1581 or 1582, in Chipping Norton, Oxfordshire – 23 November 1612, in Prague) was an English-Czech poet, known for her Neo-Latin poetry. She had the unusual distinction for a woman of the time of having her poetry published.

Biography and early life

Elizabeth was born to Joanna Cooper (23 June 1563 in Chipping Norton - 1606) and her first husband, John Weston, about whom almost nothing is known. He died when she was six months old. Soon after, Elizabeth's mother was remarried, to the English renaissance occultist, Edward Kelley, who was a well-known alchemist, and the family left England for Prague in Bohemia. Kelley's interest in alchemical projects drew the attention of the emperor Rudolf II, who became a patron of his work along with that of the alchemist-mathematician John Dee.

Elizabeth was raised in a stable home environment with progressive parents who believed in equal education for their children regardless of sex. Elizabeth's stepfather hired a Latin tutor, John Hammond, for her and she attended university lectures, which led to a formal education. Elizabeth was learned in multiple languages including Czech, English, German, Italian, and Latin.

Early in Elizabeth's adult life, her family fortune turned for the worse. Her stepfather had a falling out of favour with the royal monarch and was imprisoned after being accused of treason. Kelley's imprisonment led Elizabeth to write letters of appeal to the emperor's court. It is not known how much these letters helped her stepfather's sentence.

In 1603, Elizabeth married a jurist, Johannes Leo, with whom she had seven children.

Elizabeth's work

Elizabeth's work gained the attention of many scholars because of her expertise in Latin verse and prose. Among the scholars were Silesian nobles, Georgics Martinius Von Baldhoven and Nicolas Maius, with both of whom she developed friendships. Baldhoven tirelessly supported Elizabeth's work, urging her to publish it. In 1602, Baldhoven published Elizabeth's work, Poemata, in two volumes, out of his own money. The volume included epitaphs, idyllic reveries, odes to Emperor Rudolf II (originally sent to him with the intention of convincing him to lend money), and odes to herself. In 1606, her second volume of work, Parthenicon Libri III, which means, maidenly writings, was published in three volumes. It included epigrams, elegies, letters of appeals to officials, poems about the flood in Prague, and fables of Aesop. This work also includes a large section of an exchange of letters written to and by Elizabeth. Elizabeth made a name for herself by being one of the best neo-Latin poets of her time but also by having her work published in her own name. Elizabeth's writing included secular verse, classical knowledge, myth, history, and occasional verse, and touched on female traits of chastity and modesty.

While not much more is known about Elizabeth's life after these publications, Ballard posits that her husband was still alive in 1605 because of the epistle she wrote, Prague Nonis Marii, which was published the following year.

Influence
During her lifetime, many humanists across Europe, including Jan Dousa, celebrated her poetic achievement. Some decades later, John Evelyn praised Elizabeth as, with Sir Thomas More, the best of neo-Latin poets.

Death and legacy
Elizabeth died in 1612, and contemporary epitaphs say she died of consumption (not in childbirth). She is buried in St. Thomas' Church in Malá Strana in Prague.

Elizabeth was known as Virgo Angla,, Latin for "the English Maiden," Her work is referred to as Westonia, which is also her own Latin name.

Notes

References

Sources
 Ballard, George. Memoirs of Several Ladies of Great Britain. Oxford, 1752.
 Cheney, David and Brenda Hosington, M. Collected Writings. University of Toronto Press, 2000. 
 King, Margaret, L. Women of the Renaissance. The University of Chicago Press, 1991. 
 Reynolds, Myra. The Learned Lady. Boston and New York Houghton Mifflin Company, 1920.
 Radio Praha interview with Susan Bassnett on the poetess
 Collected Writings of Elizabeth Jane Weston
 Parthenica (at CAMENA)
 Susan Bassnett: "Revising a Biography: A New Interpretation of the Life of Elizabeth Jane Weston (Westonia), Based on Her Autobiographical Poem on the Occasion of the Death of Her Mother." Cahiers Elisabethains 37 (1990): 1–8.
 John Dee: Interdisciplinary Studies in English Renaissance Thought (International Archives of the History of Ideas), Stephen Clucas (Editor), 2006, chapter 13 by Susan Bassnett: "Edward Kelley’s Family in the Writings of John Dee", p. 285 - 294.
 Louise Schleiner: "Tudor and Stuart Women Writers", Indiana University Press, 1994, p. 96 - 106.
 Robin Wasserman: 2012 "The Book of Blood and Shadow" a novel about -among others- her works with Edward Kelley and a machine he says that can communicate with angels.

1580s births
1612 deaths
17th-century Latin-language writers
17th-century English women writers
17th-century English writers
17th-century English poets
Czech poets
Czech women writers
Deaths in childbirth
Neoclassical writers
Writers from Prague
New Latin-language poets
16th-century English women writers
16th-century English writers
English emigrants